The Manú poison frog (Ameerega macero) is a frog species in the family Dendrobatidae found in southern Peru and Brazil. It can be found in the drainages of the Manú, Urubamba, Upper Purus and Ucayali Rivers. It can also be found in Serra do Divisor National Park and Alto Juruá Extractive Reserve.

Its natural habitats are lowland tropical moist forests and montane forests, in particular bamboo forests, at elevations of 150–1,450 m. It is threatened by habitat loss due to agriculture, and is illegally harvested for the pet trade.

References

Ameerega
Amphibians of Brazil
Amphibians of Peru
Amphibians described in 1993
Taxonomy articles created by Polbot